Wilfrid Aka (born 16 June 1979) is a French-born Ivorian professional basketball player for JSA Bordeaux. He is also a member of the Côte d'Ivoire national basketball team.

Aka has spent his entire career playing for teams in the French Ligue Nationale de Basketball. Aka joined his most recent team, Paris-Levallois Basket, before the 2008-09 season. He helped the team, which had just suffered relegation the year before, return to the top-tier of French basketball by winning the B Division of the League.  He averaged 2.3 points per game and saw action in 26 games off the bench for the team.  He returned to the team for the 2009-10 season.

Aka competed as a member of the Côte d'Ivoire national basketball team for the first time at the 2009 FIBA Africa Championship.  He saw action in all nine games for the Ivorians, who won the silver medal to qualify for the 2010 FIBA World Championship.

References

External links
LNB profile

1979 births
Living people
ADA Blois Basket 41 players
ALM Évreux Basket players
Chorale Roanne Basket players
French men's basketball players
French sportspeople of Ivorian descent
Citizens of Ivory Coast through descent
Ivorian men's basketball players
JA Vichy players
Orléans Loiret Basket players
Metropolitans 92 players
Shooting guards
Basketball players from Paris
STB Le Havre players